In French law, établissement public à caractère scientifique, culturel et professionnel (EPSCP; English: public scientific, cultural or professional establishment) is a formal category of more than one hundred and thirty public higher education institutes in the fields of sciences, culture and professional education. EPSCP have legal, administrative and financial autonomy in the French education system.

EPSCP category includes: 
 public universities, per se
 four groups of other institutes with an operational status equivalent to a university.

Organisation 

EPSCP have full scientific autonomy to organise their research area, their curricula and degrees, up to and including doctoral degrees. They operate on the basis of a  4-year objective roadmap that they define and agree with the national fund-granting authority and their achievements are assessed by a national evaluation agency for research and higher education. They also have the ability to create their own research foundations.

Different types of EPSCP 
The law establishes different groups of EPSCP, which are described below.

Universities 

The 81 universities and institutes of technology are EPSCP led by a president and administered by a board of directors. They deliver bachelor, master and doctoral degrees as well as continuous education. They also contribute to national research programmes.

Autonomous higher education institutes 
 
These higher education institutes with a university-equivalent status are managed by a board of directors, assisted by a scientific council and a board of studies and academic life. Chairman of the Board of Directors is elected from among persons outside of the institute. The director is appointed by the Minister of Higher Education for a period of 5 years. 
The following institutions have this status:
 Centrale Graduate School   
 École centrale de Lille 
 École centrale de Lyon 
 École centrale de Marseille 
 École centrale de Nantes
 École nationale supérieure des arts et industries textiles  
  Ecole nationale d'ingénieurs de Saint-Etienne
 Institut national des sciences appliquées are institutes of technology
 INSA Lyon
 INSA Toulouse
 INSA Rennes
 INSA Strasbourg
 INSA Rouen
 Universities of Technology
 The University of Technology of Belfort-Montbéliard (Université de Technologie de Belfort-Montbéliard or UTBM)
 The University of Technology of Compiègne (Université de Technologie de Compiègne or UTC)
 The University of Technology of Troyes (Université de Technologie de Troyes or UTT)
 Institut supérieur de mécanique de Paris

Écoles normales supérieures 

The four École normale supérieures are institutions educating researchers and professors.
 
The ENS have a board of directors and a scientific council, and are headed by an appointed director.

French institutes abroad 
There are five French institutes operating outside France, hosting world-class researchers.
These institutes are intended to provide an intellectual and material support to such researchers, including the presence of resource materials in French language. Some of these institutes can also provide accommodation for researchers. 

The following institutions are included in this sub-group :
 Casa de Velázquez in Madrid
 École française d'Athènes
 École française d'Extrême-Orient
 École française de Rome
 Institut Français d'Archéologie Orientale in Cairo

Grands établissements 

Twenty large institutions with diverse roles are included in this sub-group.

External links 
 .

Educational institutions in France
Grandes écoles
Grands établissements
Universities and colleges in France